The Russian student women's football team represents Russia in international women's football. The team is controlled by the Football Union of Russia.

Universiade record

References

Football in Russia